Costigliole may refer to 2 Italian municipalities in Piedmont:

Costigliole d'Asti, in the Province of Asti
Costigliole Saluzzo, in the Province of Cuneo